Greatest Hits is a compilation album released by the funk group Cameo. It was the fourth album to be released by the band (and the third collection of previously released material) in 1998.

This 12-track collection can be considered a combination of the 1993 album The Best of Cameo and its sequel in 1996. Only one track, "You Make Me Work", was not on either volume. Some of the tracks are edited versions.

Track listing 
 "Word Up!" – 4:20 - Blackmon, Jenkins
 "Single Life" – 4:29 - Blackmon, Jenkins
 "Candy" – 4:25 - Blackmon, Jenkins
 "She's Strange" – 3:47 - Blackmon, Jenkins
 "Attack Me With Your Love" – 4:32 - Blackmon, Kendrick
 "Back and Forth" – 3:51 - Blackmon, Jenkins, Kendrick, Leftenant
 "You Make Me Work" – 4:44 - Blackmon
 "I Just Want to Be" – 3:42 - Blackmon, Johnson
 "Sparkle" – 4:02 - Blackmon, Lockett
 "Skin I'm In" – 4:35 - Blackmon
 "Freaky Dancin'" – 4:16 - Blackmon, Jenkins
 "Keep It Hot" – 4:02 - Blackmon, Lockett

References

1998 greatest hits albums
Cameo (band) compilation albums